Høllen is a fishing village in Kristiansand municipality in Agder county, Norway.  The village is located at the mouth of the river Søgneelva, between the villages of Eig to the west, Tangvall to the north, and Åros to the east.  Høllen is part of the greater Søgne urban area.  It has a well-protected harbour and over the centuries has had shipyards, a post office, and it was the site of a Thing in the 1500s. There is regular ferry boat service to Ny-Hellesund from Høllen.

As a part of the greater Søgne urban area in Kristiansand, separate population statistics are not tracked for Høllen.

References

Villages in Agder
Søgne
Kristiansand